The Peddlers were a British jazz/soul trio of the 1960s and 1970s. Led by organist Roy Phillips, they had hits with "Birth" and "Girlie". They were very popular in New Zealand during the 1970s.

History
The Peddlers formed in Manchester in April 1964, as a trio of
 Trevor Morais (Trevor Gladstone Emanuel Morais, born 10 October 1944, Liverpool) - the drummer had previously played with Faron's Flamingos and Rory Storm and the Hurricanes (who had struggled to replace Ringo Starr after he had left to join The Beatles).
 Tab Martin (Alan Raymond Brearey, 24 December 1944, Newcastle upon Tyne) the bassist, noted for his peculiar style of playing a Gibson EB-2 bass guitar in an upright position as though it were a string bass.
 Roy Phillips (Roy Godfrey Phillips, 5 May 1941, Parkstone, Poole, Dorset). on vocals and keyboards, had been in the Saints, the Tornados, and also the Soundtracks.

Career

1960s
The group's history began as the Song Peddlers, which with addition of Trevor Morais, became a trio. The lineup also included Tab Martin and Roy Phillips. The Song Peddlers were managed by Alan Lewis. A single, "Rose Marie" bw "I'm Not Afraid" was released on the Philips label in 1964. The group then changed its name to The Peddlers. Also in 1964, and now known as the Peddlers they had some minor success with their debut single, "Let the Sun Shine In" which was written by Teddy Randazzo.

In 1966, the group began a residency at Annies Room in London also playing the Scotch of St James and The Pickwick where the group's first album Live at the Pickwick, including an introduction by Pete Murray, was recorded.

The trio released six singles and an EP on the Philips record label before joining CBS in 1967. Their cover of "Let the Sunshine In" (1965) charted on the UK Singles Chart. In 1968 they released the album Freewheelers, consisting of standards arranged by Keith Mansfield. The follow-up, 1968's Three in a Cell, included a version of "On a Clear Day You Can See Forever", from the 1965 musical of the same name, which was later sampled for its bass and Hammond organ riff. The third and final CBS album, Birthday, followed in 1969, and brought the band two UK Top 40 singles in "Girlie", and "Birth" which reached No. 17.

1970s
The single "Girlie" did well in New Zealand, hitting the no. 1 spot in May 1970. Following Birthday, the Peddlers returned to Philips, where they released Georgia on My Mind in 1971 and Suite London (1972).

On Philips they released Three for All in 1970 including "Tell the World Were Not In", "Working Again", "My Funny Valentine" and "Love for Sale".

Trevor Morais left the trio during an Australian tour in 1972, and was replaced on drums by New Zealander Paul Johnston. The Peddlers disbanded in 1976. The anthology How Cool Is Cool... The Complete CBS Recordings was released by CBS in 2002.

Electronic record producer Luke Vibert sampled their "Impressions (Part 3)" for "The Premise", a track which featured on his album, Musipal.

After the Peddlers
Trevor Morais joined Quantum Jump. He later opened the El Cortijo studio in Málaga, Spain, and has worked with David Essex, Howard Jones, Elkie Brooks and Björk.

Tab Martin lives in Portugal.

Roy Phillips now lives in Christchurch, New Zealand, and performs live shows around the country. He contributed lead vocals for the track "Closer" on the 2007 Lord Large album, The Lord's First XI.

Paul Johnston returned to New Zealand and became a chiropractor. He died in 2013.

A Peddlers reunion gig was held on 25 May 2009 in Auckland, New Zealand.

In popular culture
 The Peddlers provided the theme song for the 1968 Hammer film The Lost Continent.
 The song "Tell The World We're Not In" was featured in the 1970 horror film Goodbye Gemini.
 In 2012, season 5 episode 3 ("Hazard Pay") of AMC-TV's Breaking Bad used "On a Clear Day..." as the musical background over a montage of Walt and Jesse's meth manufacturing. This was later parodied in The Simpsons season 30 episode 22 "Woo-hoo Dunnit?"

Discography

Albums

Singles

Citations

References
 
 
 
 "The Peddlers" http://www.thepeddlers.co.uk/

External links
 The Peddlers official site
 Roy Phillips official site

 
English pop music groups
English jazz ensembles
British soul musical groups
Musical groups established in 1964
Musical groups disestablished in 1976
Philips Records artists
CBS Records artists